Tyater-Araslanovo (Täter-Arıślan) is a rural locality (a selo) in Tyater-Araslanovsky Selsoviet, Sterlibashevsky District, Bashkortostan, Russia. The population was 996 as of 2010. There are 9 streets.

Geography 
Tyater-Araslanovo is located 27 km southwest of Sterlibashevo (the district's administrative centre) by road. Yasherganovo is the nearest rural locality.

References 

Rural localities in Sterlibashevsky District